Wentworth Falls railway station is located on the Main Western line in New South Wales, Australia. It serves the Blue Mountains town of Wentworth Falls opening on 22 July 1867 as Weatherboard, being renamed Wentworth Falls on 21 April 1879.

In 1902, it was converted to an island platform when the line was duplicated. A passing loop previously existed north of Platform 1 but has been disconnected from the main line.

Transport Heritage NSW celebrated 150 years of the railway with a weekend of events in July 2017.

Upgrade
In May 2013, a major upgrade for Wentworth Falls was announced as part of the Transport Access Program. In 2014, the station building was restored, with the ochre paint removed to return it to bare brick.

In December 2014, designs for the major transformation were released, including three lifts, a covered walkway and bike parking facilities. Subject to community feedback, planning approval and contract award, work will start in the first half of 2015. In May 2015, it was announced that the plans had been approved and that tenders were being assessed.

Completion of the upgrade saw the lifts opened on Monday 19 June 2017.

Platforms & services
Wentworth Falls has one island platform with two sides. It is serviced by NSW TrainLink Blue Mountains Line services travelling from Sydney Central to Lithgow.

Transport links
Blue Mountains Transit operate two routes via Wentworth Falls station:
685: North Wentworth Falls to Katoomba
690K: Springwood to Katoomba

References

External links

Wentworth Falls station details Transport for New South Wales

Easy Access railway stations in New South Wales
Railway stations in Australia opened in 1867
Regional railway stations in New South Wales
Short-platform railway stations in New South Wales, 6 cars
Main Western railway line, New South Wales